The Japanese Community School of Athens ( Atene Nihonjin Gakkō) was a Japanese international school in the Ano-Pefki (Άνω Πεύκη) area of Pefki, Greece in the Athens metropolitan area.

The school was designated on February 25, 1977 (Showa 52) and certified on December 18, 1992 (Heisei 4). It closed in April 2007 (Heisei 19).) It was decertified on March 31, 2012 (Heisei 24).

The school had a magazine, Tabidachi (旅立ち).

References

Further reading
 樽本 信浩 and 全国海外子女教育・国際理解教育研究協議会. ヤーサス!エーゲ海 : アテネ日本人学校の子どもたち. 樽本信浩著 ; 全国海外子女教育国際理解教育研究協議会監修. （国際理解教育選書シリーズ）. 創友社, [2003.1] See profile at CiNii.

External links

  Japanese Community School of Athens
 
  
  Japanese Community in Athens (アテネ日本人会  Atene Nihonjinkai)

Athens
International schools in Attica
Defunct schools in Greece
Defunct Japanese international schools
Schools in Athens
2007 disestablishments in Greece
Educational institutions disestablished in 2007
Greece–Japan relations